David Updike (born 1957) is an American writer and academic. Updike was the son of author John Updike who used David as a model in several pieces of fictional writing including Wife-wooing, Avec la Bebe-sitter, Son, and Separating.

David Updike was born in 1957 as the second child of John Updike and Mary Pennington (Updike) Weatherall. Updike grew up largely in Ipswich, Massachusetts and graduated from Harvard University 1980 with an art history degree and then received a M.A.T. from Columbia University in 1984. While in college in 1978 Updike published the first of nine pieces in The New Yorker where his father and paternal grandmother also published. In 1988 Updike published a collection of short stories entitled Out on the Marsh and later he published a four piece set of young adult books entitled A Winter Journey, An Autumn Tale, A Spring Story, and The Sounds of Summer. In 2006 he published a novel entitled novel, Ivy's Turn, regarding interracial relationships in the 1990s and the Civil Rights movement of the 1960s. In 2009 Updike published another collection of short stories entitled Old Girlfriends. In addition to his pieces in The New Yorker, Updike has published individual short stories in many publications including Epiphany, Sargasso, Harpers, and New York Times Magazine, which published his first publication in college.  Updike provided the photographs for his father's children's book, A Helpful Alphabet of Friendly Objects. Updike has taught creative writing at M.I.T and currently is a professor of English at Boston's Roxbury Community College. Updike's wife, Wambui, is a native of Kenya, and they have a son Wesley and live in Cambridge, Massachusetts. Updike considers his literary career more similar to his grandmother, Linda Grace Hoyer Updike's, than his father's.

References

American writers
People from Ipswich, Massachusetts
Teachers College, Columbia University alumni
Harvard College alumni
Massachusetts Institute of Technology faculty
1957 births
Living people